Interstate 190 (I-190, locally known as  One-Ninety) is a north–south auxiliary Interstate Highway in the United States that connects I-90 in Buffalo, New York, with the Canadian border at Lewiston, New York, near Niagara Falls. The freeway bisects downtown Buffalo before crossing Grand Island and travelling around the outskirts of Niagara Falls before crossing the Niagara River on the Lewiston–Queenston Bridge into the Canadian province of Ontario. In Canada, the freeway continues as Ontario Highway 405, a short spur connecting with the Queen Elizabeth Way (QEW), which in turn provides a freeway connection to Toronto, Canada's largest city. The  route also provides access to the QEW at the Peace Bridge between Buffalo and Fort Erie, Ontario. I-190 is currently the only three-digit interstate to connect directly with Canada, and one of only two to connect to an international border, the other being I-110 in Texas.

Officially, I-190 from I-90 north to New York State Route 384 (NY 384) is named the Niagara Thruway and is part of the New York State Thruway system. The remainder, from NY 384 to Lewiston, is known as the Niagara Expressway and is maintained by the New York State Department of Transportation (NYSDOT). I-190 is the only auxiliary Interstate Highway to reach the Canada–US border, and one of only two to connect to an international border, the other being I-110 in Texas.

Parts of the highway were built along the former right-of-ways of the Lehigh Valley Railroad and the Erie Canal. The entire route was built as part of the New York State Thruway in the late 1950s and early 1960s and was completed in 1964. The cost of I-190's construction had been paid off by 1996, and, by law, the tolls along the freeway were supposed to be removed at that point; however, this did not occur until 2006. The Grand Island tollbooths remained in place for 12 more years but were taken down in 2018 and replaced with high-speed electronic toll gantries.

Route description

I-190 begins at an interchange with the New York State Thruway (I-90) in Cheektowaga in Erie County, just north of the West Seneca town line and east of the Buffalo city line. I-190 heads west into Buffalo, passing the former location of the City Line toll barrier ahead of an interchange with South Ogden Street (exit 1). Farther west, I-190 meets NY 354 (exit 2), NY 16 (exit 3), and several local streets before entering downtown Buffalo. Within the downtown area, I-190 passes between KeyBank Center and Sahlen Field near an interchange with NY 5 (exit 7) on the shores of Lake Erie. At NY 5, I-190 turns northward to follow the path of the Niagara River. Shortly after meeting NY 266 (exit 8) immediately northwest of downtown, I-190 interchanges with Porter Avenue (exit 9), a local roadway connecting I-190 to the Peace Bridge and, thus, the QEW in Canada.

North of downtown Buffalo, I-190 follows the eastern edge of the Black Rock Channel (and passes the site of the former Black Rock toll barrier) before rejoining the banks of the Niagara near an exit with the Scajaquada Expressway (NY 198, exit 11). I-190 continues north through the northern extents of Buffalo, meeting multiple streets before separating from the Niagara and interchanging with NY 266 and NY 324 (exits 15 and 16) in quick succession. At exit 16, NY 324 joins I-190 northward through western Tonawanda. The two routes then meet I-290 and NY 266 a second time prior to crossing the Niagara River on the South Grand Island Bridge. NY 324 leaves the expressway shortly after arriving on Grand Island at exit 18.

I-190 and NY 324 follow parallel routings across Grand Island, with both roads passing on opposite sides of Niagara Amusement Park & Splash World, a local amusement park, near the center of the island. At the northern edge of the island, NY 324, as signed, terminates at exit 20; however, officially, NY 324 rejoins I-190 across the Niagara River once again via the North Grand Island Bridge. Now in Niagara Falls, Niagara County, NY 324 ends at a complex interchange featuring NY 384, the Niagara Scenic Parkway, and the LaSalle Expressway on the eastern bank of the river. Farther north, I-190 meets US Route 62 (US 62) at exit 22 and NY 182 at exit 23.

Past NY 182, I-190 turns to the northwest, skirting the northeastern edge of Niagara Falls and roughly paralleling NY 265 to the east. In Lewiston, the expressway meets NY 31 at exit 24 southwest of the large Robert Moses Niagara Power Plant reservoir. I-190 continues onward, crossing the canal between the reservoir and the power plant on a small dam also used by NY 265. The freeway then interchanges with NY 265, the Niagara Scenic Parkway, and NY 104 at the expansive exit 25 before curving to the west and terminating at the approach to the Lewiston–Queenston Bridge. Across the bridge in Queenston, Ontario, the roadway becomes Highway 405.

History

The portion of modern I-190 south of NY 384 in Niagara Falls was originally built by the New York State Thruway Authority (NYSTA) as part of the New York State Thruway system. Construction on two segments of the highway—from South Ogden Street to Porter Avenue in downtown Buffalo and from Beaver Island Parkway to West River Road on Grand Island—began in 1953. On Grand Island, construction began to connect the two existing two lane bridges on July 16, 1954. By 1955, construction had begun on the remainder of the Niagara Thruway. On July 30, 1959, the thruway was opened from the Tri-Level Interchange at I-90 to Porter Avenue and from Sheridan Drive to the southern Grand Island bridge. The remainder of the highway, with the exception of the twinned Grand Island bridges, was completed by 1964.

On August 14, 1957, the routing of what is now I-190 (including the then-partially complete Niagara Thruway) was originally designated as I-90N, as intercity routes were assigned before auxiliary Interstate numbers were applied to the shorter intracity routes. I-90N was renumbered to I-190 on February 24, 1959. Construction on the portion of I-190 north of NY 384 began  and was completed by 1964.

In 1991, maintenance of I-84 in downstate New York was transferred from NYSDOT to the NYSTA. The monies for that purpose came from tolls levied on I-190 in downtown Buffalo. Under the laws authorizing the thruway construction, the tolls were to be removed once the original bonds used to pay for the construction were paid off, which occurred in 1996; however, the tolls would remain for 10 more years. Attorney Carl Paladino brought a lawsuit against the state in 2006 to force the removal of the tolls. On October 30, 2006, the NYSTA voted to both begin the process of returning maintenance of I-84 to NYSDOT and to remove the tolls on I-190 in Buffalo. Collection of the tolls stopped that day. Both major candidates in the 2006 New York gubernatorial election, Democrat Eliot Spitzer and Republican John Faso, had pledged to remove the tolls on I-190 if elected. While the toll barriers in Buffalo were demolished, the tolls further north on the two Grand Island bridges remained for another 12 years. They were finally replaced with electronic tolling in 2018 and have since been demolished.

Exit list

See also

 LaSalle Expressway
 Robert Moses State Parkway

References

External links

90-1 New York
90-1
90-1
Transportation in Buffalo, New York
Transportation in Erie County, New York
Transportation in Niagara County, New York
1 (New York)